Vaterpolski klub Solaris, commonly referred to as VK Solaris or simply Solaris, is a men's professional water polo club based in Šibenik, Croatia. As of 2022–22 season, it competes in the Croatian First League and Regional League A1.

History
The club was founded in the summer 2015 by merging former clubs VK Šibenik and VK Adriatic for the need to become a strong water polo club in Šibenik. After some problems, the merge finally came in August 2015, and the newly formed VK Solaris takes over Adriatic's place and organization, and relies on the Šibenik's tradition. 

In May 2019, the club came fifth in the Croatian First League championship, defeating POŠK by a scoreline of 20–14 on aggregate (14–5, 6–9). Winning the fifth place, Solaris secured its place in the following season of LEN Europa Cup.

Players

Current squad
Season 2020/21

Personnel
Source:

Honours

Domestic
 Croatian First League fifth place: 2018–19
 Croatian First League fourth place: 2019–20

Regional
 Regional League A2 runner-up: 2018–19, 2019–20 (Promotion to Regional League)

Notable players
  Andrija Komadina
  Andrija Vlahović

Notable coaches
  Joško Kreković
  Renato Vrbičić

References

External links
Vaterpolski klub Solaris - Club website
Vaterpolski klub Solaris - Home | Facebook

Water polo clubs in Croatia